Graduate Assessment Test (GAT) is a test for admission in MS/MPhil and PhD programs and for law graduates (LLB) to enrolled as an Advocate in Pakistan. The test is administered by the National Testing Service (NTS). The Law GAT test is administered by the Higher Education Commission HEC.

Types of Tests

There are the following kinds of GAT tests.

 GAT-General, for admission in MS/MPhil programs
 GAT-Subject, for admission in PhD programs
 Law GAT, for law graduates (LLB) to enrolled as an Advocate in Pakistan
 SEE Law GAT, for law graduates from Foreign Universities to enrolled as an Advocate in Pakistan

Validity of the Score

The test score of GAT General or GAT Subject remains valid for 2 years.
The test score of Law GAT and SEE Law is valid for a lifetime.

Number of Chances to appear in Law GAT

There are three chances to appear in the HEC Law GAT test.

Number of Chances to appear in SEE Law

There are three chances to appear in HEC SEE Law test.

References

External links
 Official NTS website
 Official NTS GAT-General website
 Official NTS GAT-Subject website
 Official HEC LAW-Test website

Entrance examinations
Standardised tests in Pakistan